Laukvik or Laukvika is a village in Vågan Municipality in Nordland county, Norway.  The fishing village is located along the Norwegian Sea on the northwestern shore of the island of Austvågøya, just west of the village of Straumnes.  Together, Laukvik and Straumnes have about 350 residents.

References

Villages in Nordland
Vågan